In mathematics, nuclear spaces are topological vector spaces that can be viewed as a generalization of finite dimensional Euclidean spaces and share many of their desirable properties. Nuclear spaces are however quite different from Hilbert spaces, another generalization of finite dimensional Euclidean spaces. They were introduced by Alexander Grothendieck.

The topology on nuclear spaces can be defined by a family of seminorms whose unit balls decrease rapidly in size. Vector spaces whose elements are "smooth" in some sense tend to be nuclear spaces; a typical example of a nuclear space is the set of smooth functions on a compact manifold. All finite-dimensional vector spaces are nuclear. There are no Banach spaces that are nuclear, except for the finite-dimensional ones. In practice a sort of converse to this is often true: if a "naturally occurring" topological vector space is  a Banach space, then there is a good chance that it is nuclear.

Original motivation: The Schwartz kernel theorem 

We now describe this motivation. 

In short, the Schwartz kernel theorem states that:

where all of these TVS-isomorphisms are canonical. 

Why does such a nice result hold for the space of distributions and test functions but not for the Hilbert space  (which is generally considered one of the "nicest" TVSs)? 
This question led Grothendieck to discover nuclear spaces, nuclear maps, and the injective tensor product.

Motivations from geometry 

Another set of motivating examples comes directly from geometry and smooth manifold theoryappendix 2. Given smooth manifolds  and a locally convex Hausdorff topological vector space, then there are the following isomorphisms of nuclear spaces

 
 

Definition 

This section lists some of the more common definitions of a nuclear space. The definitions below are all equivalent. Note that some authors use a more restrictive definition of a nuclear space, by adding the condition that the space should also be a Fréchet space. (This means that the space is complete and the topology is given by a  family of seminorms.)

The following definition was used by Grothendieck to define nuclear spaces.

Definition 0: Let  be a locally convex topological vector space. Then  is nuclear if for any locally convex space  the canonical vector space embedding  is an embedding of TVSs whose image is dense in the codomain (where the domain  is the projective tensor product and the codomain is the space of all separately continuous bilinear forms on  endowed with the topology of uniform convergence on equicontinuous subsets). 

We start by recalling some background. A locally convex topological vector space  has a topology that is defined by some family of seminorms. For any seminorm, the unit ball is a closed convex symmetric neighborhood of the origin, and conversely any closed convex symmetric neighborhood of 0 is the unit ball of some seminorm. (For complex vector spaces, the condition "symmetric" should be replaced by "balanced".) 
If  is a seminorm on   then  denotes the Banach space given by completing the auxiliary normed space using the seminorm  There is a natural map  (not necessarily injective).

The space  is nuclear when a stronger condition holds, namely that these maps are nuclear operators. The condition of being a nuclear operator is subtle, and more details are available in the corresponding article.

Definition 1: A nuclear space is a locally convex topological vector space such that for any seminorm  we can find a larger seminorm  so that the natural map  is nuclear.

Informally, this means that whenever we are given the unit ball of some seminorm, we can find a "much smaller" unit ball of another seminorm inside it, or that any neighborhood of 0 contains a "much smaller" neighborhood. It is not necessary to check this condition for all seminorms  ; it is sufficient to check it for a set of seminorms that generate the topology, in other words, a set of seminorms that are a subbase for the topology.

Instead of using arbitrary Banach spaces and nuclear operators, we can give a definition in terms of Hilbert spaces and trace class operators, which are easier to understand. 
(On Hilbert spaces nuclear operators are often called trace class operators.)
We will say that a seminorm  is a Hilbert seminorm if  is a Hilbert space, or equivalently if  comes from a sesquilinear positive semidefinite form on  

Some authors prefer to use Hilbert–Schmidt operators rather than trace class operators. This makes little difference, because any trace class operator is Hilbert–Schmidt, and the product of two Hilbert–Schmidt operators is of trace class.

If we are willing to use the concept of a nuclear operator from an arbitrary locally convex topological vector space to a Banach space, we can give shorter definitions as follows:

Definition 5: A nuclear space is a locally convex topological vector space such that any continuous linear map to a Banach space is nuclear.

Grothendieck used a definition similar to the following one:

In fact it is sufficient to check this just for Banach spaces  or even just for the single Banach space  of absolutely convergent series.

Characterizations 

Let  be a Hausdorff locally convex space. Then the following are equivalent:
  is nuclear; 
 for any locally convex space  the canonical vector space embedding  is an embedding of TVSs whose image is dense in the codomain; 
 for any Banach space  the canonical vector space embedding  is a surjective isomorphism of TVSs; 
 for any locally convex Hausdorff space  the canonical vector space embedding  is a surjective isomorphism of TVSs; 
 for any seminorm  we can find a larger seminorm  so that the natural map  is nuclear; 
 for any seminorm  we can find a larger seminorm  so that the canonical injection  is nuclear; 
  has a topology defined by a family of Hilbert seminorms, such that for any Hilbert seminorm  we can find a larger Hilbert seminorm  so that the natural map  is Hilbert–Schmidt; 
 any continuous linear map to a Banach space is nuclear; 
 every linear map from a Banach space into  that transforms the unit ball into an equicontinuous set, is nuclear; 

If  is a Fréchet space then the following are equivalent:
  is nuclear; 

Sufficient conditions 

 A locally convex Hausdorff space is nuclear if and only if its completion is nuclear.
 Every subspace of a nuclear space is nuclear. 
 Every Hausdorff quotient space of a nuclear space is nuclear. 
 The inductive limit of a countable sequence of nuclear spaces is nuclear. 
 The locally convex direct sum of a countable sequence of nuclear spaces is nuclear. 
 The strong dual of a nuclear Fréchet space is nuclear.
 In general, the strong dual of a nuclear space may fail to be nuclear.
 A Fréchet space whose strong dual is nuclear is itself nuclear.
 The limit of a family of nuclear spaces is nuclear. 
 The product of a family of nuclear spaces is nuclear. 
 The completion of a nuclear space is nuclear (and in fact a space is nuclear if and only if its completion is nuclear).
 The tensor product of two nuclear spaces is nuclear.
 The projective tensor product, as well as its completion, of two nuclear spaces is nuclear.

 If  is nuclear then the vector space of continuous linear maps  endowed with the topology of simple convergence is a nuclear space.
 If  is a semi-reflexive space whose strong dual is nuclear and if  is nuclear then the  vector space of continuous linear maps  (endowed with the topology of uniform convergence on bounded subsets of  ) is a nuclear space.

Examples 

A relatively simple infinite dimensional example of a nuclear space is the space of all rapidly decreasing sequences  ("Rapidly decreasing" means that  is bounded for any polynomial ). For each real number  it is possible to define a norm  by 

If the completion in this norm is  then there is a natural map from  whenever  and this is nuclear whenever  essentially because the series  is then absolutely convergent. In particular for each norm  this is possible to find another norm, say  such that the map  is nuclear. So the space is nuclear. 

 The space of smooth functions on any compact manifold is nuclear.
 The space of entire holomorphic functions on the complex plane is nuclear.

Properties 

Nuclear spaces are in many ways similar to finite-dimensional spaces and have many of their good properties.

 Every finite-dimensional Hausdorff space is nuclear.
 A Fréchet space is nuclear if and only if its strong dual is nuclear.
 Every bounded subset of a nuclear space is precompact (recall that a set is precompact if its closure in the completion of the space is compact). This is analogous to the Heine-Borel theorem. In contrast, no infinite dimensional normed space has this property (although the finite dimensional spaces do). 
 If  is a quasi-complete (i.e. all closed and bounded subsets are complete) nuclear space then  has the Heine-Borel property.
 A nuclear quasi-complete barrelled space is a Montel space.
 Every closed equicontinuous subset of the dual of a nuclear space is a compact metrizable set (for the strong dual topology).
 Every nuclear space is a subspace of a product of Hilbert spaces.
 Every nuclear space admits a basis of seminorms consisting of Hilbert norms.
 Every nuclear space is a Schwartz space.
 Every nuclear space possesses the approximation property.
 Any subspace and any quotient space by a closed subspace of a nuclear space is nuclear.
Roughly speaking this means that there is only one sensible way to define the tensor product. This property characterizes nuclear spaces 
 In the theory of measures on topological vector spaces, a basic theorem states that any continuous cylinder set measure on the dual of a nuclear Fréchet space automatically extends to a Radon measure. This is useful because it is often easy to construct cylinder set measures on topological vector spaces, but these are not good enough for most applications unless they are Radon measures (for example, they are not even countably additive in general).

The kernel theorem 
We have the following generalization of the theorem. 

Bochner–Minlos theorem 

A continuous functional  on a nuclear space  is called a characteristic functional if  and for any complex   

Given a characteristic functional on a nuclear space  the Bochner–Minlos theorem (after Salomon Bochner and Robert Adol'fovich Minlos) guarantees the existence and uniqueness of the corresponding probability measure  on the dual space  given by

This extends the inverse Fourier transform to nuclear spaces.

In particular, if  is the nuclear space

where  are Hilbert spaces, the Bochner–Minlos theorem guarantees the existence of a probability measure with the characteristic function  that is, the existence of the Gaussian measure on the dual space. Such measure is called white noise measure. When  is the Schwartz space, the corresponding random element is a random distribution.

Strongly nuclear spaces 

A strongly nuclear space is a locally convex topological vector space such that for any seminorm  there exists a larger seminorm  so that the natural map  is a strongly nuclear.

See also

References

Bibliography
   
 
  
  
  
  
   
  
  
 
 Takeyuki Hida and Si Si, Lectures on white noise functionals, World Scientific Publishing, 2008. 
 T. R. Johansen, The Bochner-Minlos Theorem for nuclear spaces and an abstract white noise space, 2003. 

  

  
 
  
  
  
  
  

Operator theory
Topological vector spaces
Topological tensor products